The 2015 Missouri Valley Conference men's soccer season was the 25th season of men's varsity soccer in the conference. The defending regular season champion was Missouri State, and the defending postseason champion was Southern Illinois University Edwardsville (SIUE).

The Missouri Valley Conference men's soccer tournament was hosted by SIUE on Bob Guelker Field at Ralph Korte Stadium in Edwardsville, Illinois on November 11, 13, and 15. The Drake Bulldogs defeated the host team in the final 1–0 and advanced to the NCAA tournament. They then upset 17th ranked Kentucky before falling in the second round to 9th ranked and 12th seeded Creighton.

Teams

Season outlook 
2015 Preseason MVC Coaches' Poll

2015 Preseason MVC All-Conference Team

Postseason

MVC Tournament 
Source:

Site Ralph Korte Stadium @ SIUE

NCAA tournament

2016 MLS SuperDraft

Honors

2015 NSCAA NCAA Division I Men's All-West Region teams
Source:

First Team
 Tim Dobrowolski; Senior Goalkeeper; Loyola Chicago; Rockford, Illinois
 Austin Ledbetter; Junior Defender; SIU Edwardsville; St. Charles, Missouri
 Mueng Sunday; Junior Midfielder; Drake; Coralville, Iowa
 James Wypych; Junior Forward; Drake; Wellington, New Zealand

Second Team
 Eric Schoendorf; Senior Defender; Loyola Chicago; Delafield, Wisconsin
 Mark Anthony Gonzalez; Senior Midfielder; Evansville; Bolton, Ontario, Canada
 Kyle Thomson; Sophomore Midfielder; Loyola Chicago; Park Ridge, Illinois
 Jabari Danzi; Senior Forward; SIU Edwardsville; Park Forest, Illinois

Third Team
 Justin Bilyeu; Senior Defender; SIU Edwardsville; St. Louis, Missouri
 Daniel Hare; Senior Defender; Loyola Chicago; Overland Park, Kansas
 Jack Griffin; Junior Midfielder; Missouri State; Beverley, England, UK
 Grant Bell; Senior Forward; Bradley; Little Falls, Minnesota

2015 CoSIDA Academic All-America teams
Source:

First Team
Jacob Wieser, Senior, SIUE, 3.95 GPA, Nursing

2015 CoSIDA Academic All-District teams
Source: 

Only All-District players were eligible for the Academic All-America ballot.

District 5 (IL, IN, MI, OH) 
Clark Emerson, Sophomore, Bradley, 4.00 GPA, Mechanical Engineering
Andrew Kovacevic, Junior, Bradley, 3.96 GPA, Finance 
Jacob Wieser, Senior, SIUE, 3.95 GPA, Nursing

District 6 (AR, IA, LA, MN, MO, MS, ND, SD, WI) 
Alec Bartlett, Srenior, Drake, 3.51 GPA, Biology
James Grunert, Junior, Drake, 3.74 GPA, Health Sciences
Ben LeMay, Junior, Drake, 3.82 GPA, Pharmacy/MBA
Darrin MacLeod, Junior, Drake, 3.49 GPA, International Business
Rob Oslica, Soophomore, Missouri State, 3.79 GPA, Cell & Molecular Biology
Phil Woods, Junior, Missouri State, 3.85 GPA, Entertainment Management 
James Wypych, Junior, Drake, 3.69 GPA, International Relations

NSCAA 2014-15 College Team Academic Award
Source: 

The NSCAA annually recognizes college and high school soccer programs that have excelled in the classroom by posting a team grade point average of 3.0 or higher. Four of the MVC's seven teams were honored.
 Drake University
 Loyola University of Chicago
 Missouri State University
 Southern Illinois University Edwardsville

2015 MVC awards
Source= 

2015 MVC Player of the Year —  Eric Shoendorf, Loyola

2015 MVC Defensive Player of the Year —  Eric Shoendorf, Loyola

2015 MVC Goalkeeper of the Year —  Tim Dobrowolski, Loyola

2015 MVC Freshman of the Year —  Frank Bak, Bradley

2015 MVC Coaching Staff of the Year —  SIUE (Mario Sanchez, David Korn, Scott Gyllenborg, Tim Boruff, Billy Berger) 

2015 MVC Fair Play Award—  Missouri State

2015 MVC All-Conference First Team

2015 MVC All-Conference Second Team

2015 MVC All-Freshman Team

2015 MVC All-Tournament Team
Source= 

2015 Missouri Valley Conference Men's Soccer Tournament MVP— Kyle Whigham, Drake

2015 MVC Men's Soccer Scholar-Athlete Team
Source=

References

 
Missouri Valley Conference
2015 NCAA Division I men's soccer season